Manitouwadge Airport  is located  southwest of Manitouwadge, Ontario, Canada.

References

External links
Manitouwadge Municipal Airport - CYMG at the municipal webpage

Registered aerodromes in Ontario
Transport in Thunder Bay District